Hey (also Romanized as Ḩey; also known as Hay) is a village in Bizineh Rud Rural District, Bizineh Rud District, Khodabandeh County, Zanjan Province, Iran. At the 2006 census, its population was 1,355, in 311 families.

References 

Populated places in Khodabandeh County